Gorenji Novaki is a dispersed settlement in the Municipality of Cerkno in the traditional Littoral region of Slovenia.

Most of the ski slopes of the Cerkno Ski Resort are in the Gornji Novaki area.

References

External links 

Gorenji Novaki on Geopedia

Populated places in the Municipality of Cerkno